John Massengale (1939 – November 27, 2013) was an American football coach. He served as the head football coach at Eastern Washington University in Cheney, Washington from 1971 to 1978, compiling a record of 35–39–1.

Massengale played college football at Northwest Missouri State College — now known as Northwest Missouri State University — lettering for two years as a two-way tackle. He began his coaching career at the high school level in Kansas and Illinois before moving on to the University of New Mexico where he worked as an assistant coach for the freshman football team and earned a doctorate degree. Massengale joined the football coach staff as Eastern Washington in 1969 as defensive coordinator under head coach Brent Wooten.

Massengale was born in  Pontiac, Michigan, in 1939. He died on November 27, 2013.

Head coaching record

References

1939 births
2013 deaths
American football tackles
Eastern Washington Eagles football coaches
New Mexico Lobos football coaches
Northwest Missouri State Bearcats football players
High school football coaches in Illinois
High school football coaches in Kansas
University of New Mexico alumni
Sportspeople from Pontiac, Michigan